Ottoschulzia is a genus of flowering plants belonging to the family Metteniusaceae.

Its native range is from south-eastern Mexico to Guatemala, and the Caribbean. It is also found in the countries of Cuba, the Dominican Republic, Haiti and Puerto Rico.
 
The genus name of Ottoschulzia is in honour of Otto Eugen Schulz (1874–1936), a German botanist, born in Berlin. 
It was first described and published in Symb. Antill. Vol.7 on page 272 in 1912.

Species
According to Kew:
Ottoschulzia cubensis 
Ottoschulzia domingensis 
Ottoschulzia pallida 
Ottoschulzia rhodoxylon

References

Metteniusaceae
Asterid genera
Plants described in 1912
Flora of Southeastern Mexico
Flora of Guatemala
Flora of Cuba
Flora of the Dominican Republic
Flora of Haiti
Flora of Puerto Rico